The Shuman Company is a literary management company launched in 1991 by veteran manager Larry Shuman. The firm's roster includes showrunners Shawn Ryan, creator of The Shield; David Shore, creator of House; and Tim Minear. The Shuman Company is also producing the 2015 film Concussion, starring Will Smith, and the popular TV show Devious Maids.

References

Talent and literary agencies
Film production companies of the United States
Mass media companies established in 1991
Companies based in Los Angeles County, California
1991 establishments in California